Hadley Hinds (born 16 September 1946) is a Barbadian sprinter. He competed in the men's 200 metres at the 1968 Summer Olympics.

References

1946 births
Living people
Athletes (track and field) at the 1968 Summer Olympics
Barbadian male sprinters
Olympic athletes of Barbados
Place of birth missing (living people)